Halichoeres brasiliensis, or the Brazilian wrasse, is a species of salt water wrasse found in the Southwest Atlantic Ocean, from Brazil to Trinidad Island.

Size

References

brasiliensis
Taxa named by Marcus Elieser Bloch
Fish described in 1791